A gilder's tip is a type of gilding brush used for transferring sheets of gold, silver, or other precious metal leaf to either a surface that has been prepared to accept the leaf or to a gilder's block where the leaf is then cut with a gilder's knife into smaller portions before being transferred to the prepared surface.  The hairs on a gilder's tip are usually made of either blue squirrel hair or the hair of a badger (sometimes other hairs are also used, such as that of a camel) arranged in a single or double row along a flat ferrule made of wood or cardboard.  In order to transfer the gold leaf, the hairs are first given a very light coating of adhesive by brushing them against a surface such as the back of the user's hand which has been coated with a thin layer of petroleum jelly (a common misconception is that static electricity causes the gold foil to attach to the brush, but this is not so) and then laying the edge of the brush along the edge of the piece of metal foil.  The jelly will cause the metal to adhere very gently to the hairs and allow the piece to be floated from the paper surface on which had previously been stored.  Because the leaf is so thin, this must be done in a room with extremely still air, and the user of the tip usually does not breathe until the leaf is in place.  Once the leaf has settled, it is often burnished with polished piece of agate to achieve a high degree of brilliance.  

Gilder's tips are necessary because touching the metal leaf with the finger tips would immediately cause the leaf to lose its coherent flattened shape and crumble irretrievably into metallic dust which then cannot be used for any purpose.

References

Gilding